Bargawan Railway Station is situated in Bargawan, Singrauli, Madhya Pradesh 486892, India, code  BRGW . It does not have a train announcement system. It is owned by Indian Railways.

References

West Central Railway zone
Railway stations in Jabalpur district